Cameraria cincinnatiella (gregarious oak leafminer moth) is a moth of the family Gracillariidae. It is known from Ontario and Quebec in Canada, and the United States (including Kentucky, Massachusetts, New York, Ohio, Wisconsin, Florida, Georgia, Illinois, Maryland, Michigan, Pennsylvania, Texas, Vermont, Connecticut and Colorado).

The wingspan is about 15 mm.

The larvae feed on Quercus species, including Quercus alba, Quercus bicolor, Quercus macrocarpa, Quercus obtusiloba, Quercus prinus and Quercus stellata. They mine the leaves of their host plant. The mine has the form of a brownish-yellow tentiform mine on the upperside of the leaf. The loosened epidermis is brownish yellow, somewhat puckered, and often covering nearly the entire leaf..The larvae feed together in a gregarious fashion, forming large mines.

References

External links
mothphotographersgroup
Bug Guide

Cameraria (moth)
Moths described in 1871

Lepidoptera of Canada
Lepidoptera of the United States
Moths of North America
Leaf miners
Taxa named by Vactor Tousey Chambers